The Birmingham Hammers were an American soccer club based in Birmingham, Alabama (although they played in nearby Vestavia Hills). They competed in the fourth-division USL League Two. The Hammers played in the fourth-division National Premier Soccer League from 2016 to 2017.

History 

The club was founded as a grassroots effort in early-to-mid 2013 by Birmingham residents, Morgan Copes and John Killian. The two formed the club after they graduated from college in the hope to garner interest from the region's soccer scene. Later founders included Evon Noyes, Eric Lopez and Wade Honeycutt. Upon ongoing outreach, the group was able to form a formal club throughout 2014, and in 2015, the Hammers fielded their first ever team, who played independent friendlies during the spring and summer of 2015.

On October 1, 2015, it was announced that the Hammers would join the fourth division NPSL.

References

External links 
 Birmingham Hammers

 
Soccer clubs in Birmingham, Alabama
2013 establishments in Alabama
Association football clubs established in 2013
Soccer clubs in Alabama
National Premier Soccer League teams
Association football clubs disestablished in 2018
2018 disestablishments in Alabama